"The Cloak and the Staff" is a science fiction novelette by American writer Gordon R. Dickson. It won the Hugo Award for Best Novelette in 1981.

Plot summary
A skilled human translator tries to balance his desire to stay alive with his need to lash out at Earth's hulking overlords, who treat humans as cattle, or at best, pets.

External links

1980 short stories
Hugo Award for Best Novelette winning works
Short stories by Gordon R. Dickson
Novelettes
Works originally published in Analog Science Fiction and Fact